Interstate 10 (I-10) runs for  in Florida as the easternmost section of an east–west Interstate Highway in the southern United States. It is also the eastern end of one of three coast-to-coast Interstates, along with I-80 and I-90. The highway runs east from the Alabama border, traveling through the Panhandle of Florida, serving the major cities of Pensacola, Tallahassee, Lake City, ending at Jacksonville, and carries the hidden Florida Department of Transportation (FDOT) designation of State Road 8 (SR 8).

Route description

The Interstate runs roughly parallel to US Highway 90 (US 90) (which intersects I-10 at five different points along its route), but is a more direct route, bypassing the central cores of many cities. I-10 runs through some of the least populated areas of the state.

I-10 crosses into Florida at Alabama state line at the Perdido River, just west of Pensacola, in Escambia County. Florida State Road 297 (SR 297, southbound) at exit 7A, gives access to the Pensacola Naval Air Station and the National Museum of Naval Aviation. On the border between Brent and Ensley, the median approaching exits 10A and 10B becomes unexpectedly wide in order to accommodate flyover on-ramps from US 29 that enter the left sides of the road. At exit 12, I-10 serves as the northern terminus of I-110, a spur route to central Pensacola. The highway leaves the county at the Escambia Bay Bridge and has two interchanges within Santa Rosa County before crossing another bridge over the Blackwater River. After that bridge, it has two more interchanges with a pair of rest areas in between before crossing the Santa Rosa–Okaloosa county line.

The road crosses the border between the Central and Eastern time zones at the long Dewey M. Johnson Bridge, over the Apalachicola River. East of the bridge over the Ochlockonee River and the rest areas that follow, I-10 widens from four to six lanes and remains that way until after the interchange with SR 61 and US 319.

Like at US 29 in Escambia County, the median for I-10 widens in the vicinity of I-75 at exits 296A and 296B in order to accommodate flyover on-ramps that enter from the left sides of the road.

A  segment between exits 303 and 324 contains no interchanges because it passes through a portion of Osceola National Forest. The sole means of leaving and reentering the highway in this section is at a pair of rest areas, the easternmost rest areas along I-10. The road widens to six lanes again at the interchange with the First Coast Expressway. Just as I-75 did with I-10 in Columbia County, I-10's interchange with I-295 uses single ramps leading to both directions on I-295 with east-to-north and south-to-west flyover ramps leading to the median of I-295. US 17 overlaps I-10 for two exits before the eastern terminus of the Interstate, located in the Brooklyn neighborhood of Jacksonville's urban core at I-95.

History

Construction

Prior to the construction of I-10, US 90 was the main east–west highway across the state.

The first section of I-10 in Florida was completed between Sanderson and Jacksonville in 1961. Construction on points westward continued in 1962. The route between Sanderson and Winfield was completed in 1963. By 1967, construction had been completed from the Alabama state line to SR 87 and was under construction from Falmouth to I-75. New construction extending I-10 east from SR 87 to Mossy Head began in 1968. The Falmouth to I-75 segment opened in 1969. Construction began in 1970 further extending I-10 eastward from Mossy Head to DeFuniak Springs. New construction began in 1973 from DeFuniak Springs to Caryville and from Drifton to Capitola; the segment between Drifton and Falmouth opened that year. The Capitola–Drifton segment was completed the following year. Construction began between Caryville and Chipley in 1974, and from Chipley to Midway in 1975. The segment between Chipley and Midway was completed in 1977 except for a small portion between Kynesville and Oakdale; in 1978, the entire length of I-10, as well as the I-110 spur in Pensacola across the state opened along its original planned route.

During the planning stage of construction, I-10 was placed just north of the central business district of Tallahassee, roughly along the current route of US 90 through town, while later a spur route was proposed to go to the core of the city. Both of these proposals were dropped and a route across the north side of the city was chosen. In 2008, the Interstate stretch in Tallahassee was expanded to six lanes to alleviate congestion. 

In 2002, I-10, along with most of Florida's Interstates, switched over from a sequential exit numbering system to a mileage-based exit numbering system.

Rest area security concerns

In 1993, a British tourist was killed at the Jefferson County rest area in a botched burglary by teens. As a result, Florida rest stops were either patrolled or closed for at least two years when lawmakers approved cutbacks. A number of rest areas are currently regularly patrolled at night by armed security, often private, due to a resurgence in rest area-related violent crime.

Hurricane Ivan

On September 16, 2004, Hurricane Ivan made landfall near Pensacola, with the resulting storm surge causing heavy damage to the I-10 bridge across Escambia Bay. As much as a quarter mile of the bridge, consisting of 58 bridge segments, collapsed into the bay, and an additional 66 segments were knocked out of alignment; most of the damage was to the eastbound lanes. A $26.5 million project was awarded the following day to Gilbert Southern/Massman and to the Parsons Corporation to make emergency repairs to the bridge. Work was completed on October 4 on the westbound bridge, restoring two-way traffic seven days ahead of schedule. The more heavily damaged eastbound bridge was completely repaired on November 20, just 66 days after Hurricane Ivan made landfall, and 27 days ahead of schedule. The contractor received $1.5 million in bonuses for the early completion. The commercial truck detour sent truck traffic into Alabama and I-65 to avoid the bridges.

The causeway that carries US 90 across the northern part of the same bay was also heavily damaged.

Exit list

References

External links

I-10 North Florida (FDOT Construction Projects between Lake City and Jacksonville)
Interstate 10 Index -- Florida(AARoads.com)

Florida
10
Expressways in Florida
10
10
10
10
10
10
10
10
10
10
10
10
10
10
10
10
Roads in Jacksonville, Florida
Transportation in Escambia County, Florida
Transportation in Santa Rosa County, Florida
Transportation in Okaloosa County, Florida
Transportation in Walton County, Florida
Transportation in Holmes County, Florida
Transportation in Washington County, Florida
Transportation in Jackson County, Florida
Transportation in Gadsden County, Florida
Transportation in Leon County, Florida
Transportation in Jefferson County, Florida
Transportation in Madison County, Florida
Transportation in Suwannee County, Florida
Transportation in Columbia County, Florida
Transportation in Baker County, Florida
Transportation in Nassau County, Florida
Transportation in Duval County, Florida
1958 establishments in Florida